The 2020 season is Hokkaido Consadole Sapporo's 9th season in the J1 League.

Squad

On loan

Competitions

The 2020 Meiji Yasuda J1 League season began on 21 February 2020.

League table

Results summary

Results by round

Results

J. League Cup

Group C

Emperor's Cup

Squad statistics

Appearances and goals

|}

Goal scorers

Disciplinary record

Notes

References

2020
Hokkaido Consadole Sapporo